is a passenger railway station  located in the city of Yonago, Tottori Prefecture, Japan. It is operated by the West Japan Railway Company (JR West).

Lines
The distance between stations to the next station, Fujimichō Station, is officially 0.5 km in rail kilometers, but the actual distance (actual km) is about 420 meters, which is the shortest distance between stations on all JR lines.

Station layout
There is no station building and the station is unattended.

History
Bakurōmachi Station opened on July 1, 1952.

Passenger statistics
In fiscal 2018, the station was used by an average of 470 passengers daily.

Surrounding area
Tottori Prefectural Yonago Higashi High School
Tottori Prefectural Yonago Technical High School
Japan National Route 181

See also
List of railway stations in Japan

References

External links 

  Bakurōmachi Station from JR-Odekake.net 

Railway stations in Japan opened in 1952
Railway stations in Tottori Prefecture
Stations of West Japan Railway Company
Yonago, Tottori